In geometry, Clifford's theorems, named after the English geometer William Kingdon Clifford, are a sequence of theorems relating to intersections of circles.

Statement 

The first theorem considers any four circles passing through a common point M and otherwise in general position, meaning that there are six additional points where exactly two of the circles cross and that no three of these crossing points are collinear.  Every set of three of these four circles has among them three crossing points, and (by the assumption of non-collinearity) there exists a circle passing through these three crossing points. The conclusion is that, like the first set of four circles, the second set of four circles defined in this way all pass through a single point P (in general not the same point as M).

The second theorem considers five circles in general position passing through a single point M.  Each subset of four circles defines a new point P according to the first theorem.  Then these five points all lie on a single circle C.

The third theorem considers six circles in general position that pass through a single point M.  Each subset of five circles defines a new circle by the second theorem.  Then these six new circles C all pass through a single point.

The sequence of theorems can be continued indefinitely.

See also
 Cox's chain
 Five circles theorem
 Miquel's six circles theorem

References
 W. K. Clifford (1882). Mathematical Papers, pages 51,2 via Internet Archive
 H. S. M. Coxeter (1965). Introduction to Geometry, page 262, John Wiley & Sons

Further reading
 H. Martini & M. Spirova (2008) "Clifford’s chain of theorems in strictly convex Minkowski planes", Publicationes Mathematicae Debrecen 72: 371–83

External links
 

Theorems about circles